Qeshlaq-e Eshqali (also Romanized as Qeshlāq-e ‘Eshq‘alī; also known as Shām Sharfeh) is a village in Minjavan-e Gharbi Rural District, Minjavan District, Khoda Afarin County, East Azerbaijan Province, Iran. At the 2006 census, its population was 66, in 12 families.

References 

Populated places in Khoda Afarin County